Corinna Harfouch (née Meffert; 16 October 1954) is a German actress.

Life and work 

Harfouch was born in Suhl, East Germany, the daughter of the teacher Wolfgang Meffert and his wife Marianne (née Kleber). She worked as a nurse and studied acting  in Berlin from 1978 to 1981. Her first husband was a Lebanese computer scientist named Nabil Harfouch, with whom she has one daughter. In 1985 she married the late Michael Gwisdek, with whom she has two sons, musician Johannes Gwisdek and actor Robert Gwisdek. In 1994, she was a member of the jury at the 44th Berlin International Film Festival.

Selected filmography 

1986: The House on the River
1987: Yasemin
1988: Die Schauspielerin
1988: Treffen in Travers
1988: Fallada: The Last Chapter
1989: Pestalozzi's Mountain
1991: The Tango Player
1991: 
1992: 
1994: Charlie & Louise - Das doppelte Lottchen
1994: Stockholm Marathon
1995: The Promise
1996: Gates of Fire (TV film)
1996: Sexy Sadie
1996: Father's Day
1996: Gefährliche Freundin (TV film)
1997: Der Ausbruch (TV film)
1997: Knockin' on Heaven's Door
1998: 
1998: The Big Mambo
1999: 
1999: To the Horizon and Beyond
2000: Fandango
2001: Vera Brühne (TV film)
2002: 
2002–2006: Eva Blond (TV series)
2003: Die fremde Frau (TV film)
2004: Downfall - portrayed Magda Goebbels
2004: 
2006:  (TV film)
2006: Perfume: The Story of a Murderer
2006: Rage (TV film)
2007: According to the Plan
2008: A Year Ago in Winter
2008: Berlin Calling
2009: 
2009: This Is Love
2011: Cracks in the Shell
2011: 
2012: Home for the Weekend
2012: Move
2013: Finsterworld
2015: Jack
2017: Fack ju Göhte 3
2019: Lara

Awards 

1993 43rd Berlin International Film Festival: Berlinale Camera
1996 Bavarian Film Awards, Best Actress

References

External links

 
 
 

1954 births
Living people
German stage actresses
People from Suhl
Ernst Busch Academy of Dramatic Arts alumni
German film actresses
German television actresses
20th-century German actresses
21st-century German actresses
Members of the Academy of Arts, Berlin